Daśārṇa was an ancient tribe of south-central  South Asia whose existence is attested during the Iron Age.

Location
The Daśārṇas lived on the Dasān river. Their neighbours to the south-east were the Pulindas.

History
The Daśārṇas were already living on the Dasān river during the period of the s.

References

Further reading

Ancient peoples of India